Big Momma's House is a 2000 American buddy cop comedy film, directed by Raja Gosnell, and written by Darryl Quarles and Don Rhymer. The film stars Martin Lawrence as an FBI agent who is tasked with tracking down an escaped convict and his loot, by going undercover as the estranged grandmother of his former girlfriend, unaware of the bond he will form with her. The film also stars Nia Long, Paul Giamatti, and Terrence Howard.

Big Momma's House received negative reviews from critics, but grossed over $117 million, leading to it receiving two sequels - Big Momma's House 2 in 2006, and Big Mommas: Like Father, Like Son in 2011.

Plot
Undercover FBI agents, Malcolm Turner and John Maxwell, find themselves assigned by their bosses into tracking down escaped convict Lester Vesco, who was serving a life sentence for murder and the armed robbery of a bank. Malcolm and John learn that Lester may be seeking to find his ex-girlfriend, Sherry Pierce, an employee of the bank who is suspected of supplying him with a key to the vault, as the money that was stolen was never recovered. Malcolm and John find themselves staking out the home of Sherry's estranged grandmother, Hattie Mae Pierce  an overweight, elderly African American woman, whom her friends affectionately call Big Momma  in Cartersville, Georgia, and soon find that she is about to leave for two weeks to visit her ill friend. Malcolm takes advantage of this by posing as Big Momma in order to bring Sherry to her house to get her to confess to her involvement in the bank robbery.

To maintain his disguise as Big Momma, Malcolm is forced to maintain the real Big Momma's lifestyle. This includes him dealing with her lecherous boyfriend, assuming her occupation as a midwife, and attending self-defense classes led by dim-witted security guard Nolan, whom the agents are later forced to recruit when he stumbles onto their operation. During this time, Malcolm bonds with Sherry and her ten-year-old son, Trent, both in disguise and as himself  posing as Big Momma's handyman  but finds nothing to link her to the robbery, nor to the missing money's location. After attending a church service with them, where he compels in his disguise for Sherry to not hold any secrets, Malcolm finds the missing money in Trent's footlocker after returning home to a surprise birthday party for the real Big Momma. His discovery is witnessed by Sherry, who confess to him that she had no idea what Lester was planning, and did not report her key was stolen out of fear of being fired.

Matters soon become complicated when John discovers that the real Big Momma has returned home. In his efforts to stop her re-entering the house, John instructs Nolan to lock her out, only for the dim-witted guard to accidentally lock Malcolm out by mistake. Lester arrives on Big Momma's house, where he tracked Sherry down and puts her in danger. Malcolm swiftly breaks into the house, whereupon he tackles Lester and subdues him after John is shot, but at the cost of his disguise being dropped in front of Sherry and Trent. After Lester is arrested and the money recovered, Malcolm finds that Sherry and Trent refuse to speak to him, being heartbroken by his deception. Seeking forgiveness, Malcolm attends a Sunday morning church service, where he confesses in a heartfelt speech to Sherry and Trent that he genuinely loves them. Big Momma forgives Malcolm for his actions, and the church crowd cheers as Malcolm and Sherry kiss, before Big Momma and the choir sing "Oh Happy Day" during the film's closing credits.

Cast

Production
The film was set in Georgia but filmed in Southern California.

The prosthetic makeup was created by Greg Cannom and Captive Audience. Cannom previously created the makeup for Mrs. Doubtfire and Bicentennial Man.

Music 

A soundtrack containing hip hop music was released on May 30, 2000, by So So Def Records. The film's theme song was "Bounce with Me" by Lil Bow Wow. The soundtrack was also a moderate success and has been certified gold since its release. As well as Lil Bow Wow, the soundtrack featured artists such as Jermaine Dupri, Da Brat, and Black Dave, whose single Go Big Girl can be heard briefly in the film. It peaked at number 41 on the Billboard 200 and number 12 on the Top R&B/Hip-Hop Albums and spawned two hit singles, "Bounce with Me" and "I've Got to Have It".

Reception

Box office 

Big Momma's House was released on June 2, 2000, and became a surprise hit in its opening weekend in North America, making $25.6 million and becoming the second-placed film behind Mission: Impossible 2 at that time. The film itself would later go on to gross over $117 million at the US box office and just under $174 million worldwide.

Critical response 
On Rotten Tomatoes, the film has an approval rating of 30% based on 81 reviews and an average rating of 5.2/10. The site's critical consensus reads: "Big Momma's House is funny in some parts, but it is essentially a one-joke movie". On Metacritic, the film has a score of 33 out of 100 based on 27 critics, indicating "generally unfavorable reviews". Audiences polled by CinemaScore gave the film an average grade of "A" on an A+ to F scale.

Roger Ebert of the Chicago Sun-Times, while admitting to laughing at many of the jokes, also felt there were tasteless moments, thinking it could be "redeemed by comedy", such as the opening toilet sequence. Todd McCarthy of Variety praised Lawrence's "engaging" performance and the old woman makeup, but criticised the film's script.

The film, and the series as a whole, have been derided as typical of "representations of the big black woman that have appeared in mass marketed comedies" which at the same time devalue the women by casting "male actors wearing Latex fat suits". One review of the third film sarcastically commented that the Big Momma's House series rigidly follows the classic Hollywood trilogy structure. By the third film, the series was derided for its unnecessary rehashing of the cross-dressing gimmick.

Sequels

The film spawned two sequels in the Big Momma series: Big Momma's House 2 (2006) and Big Mommas: Like Father, Like Son (2011). Both sequels were lighter and more family-friendly than the original story, but saw reduced takings in the box office, and were panned by film critics.

Home media 

The film was released on DVD and VHS on November 28, 2000, EVD in 2002 and a Blu-ray edition was released on September 16, 2011.

References

External links

 
 
 
 

2000 films
2000 action comedy films
20th Century Fox films
American action comedy films
African-American films
2000s English-language films
African-American comedy films
2000s police comedy films
Cross-dressing in American films
Films about bank robbery
Films directed by Raja Gosnell
Films scored by Richard Gibbs
Films set in Georgia (U.S. state)
Films shot in Los Angeles
20th Century Studios franchises
Regency Enterprises films
2000s American films